This is a list of cells in humans derived from the three embryonic germ layers – ectoderm, mesoderm, and endoderm.

Cells derived from ectoderm

Surface ectoderm

Skin
 Trichocyte
 Keratinocyte

Anterior pituitary
 Gonadotrope
 Corticotrope
 Thyrotrope
 Somatotrope
 Lactotroph

Tooth enamel
 Ameloblast

Neural crest

Peripheral nervous system
 Neuron
 Glia
 Schwann cell
 Satellite glial cell

Neuroendocrine system
 Chromaffin cell
 Glomus cell

Skin
 Melanocyte
 Nevus cell
 Merkel cell

Teeth
 Odontoblast
 Cementoblast

Eyes
 Corneal keratocyte

Neural tube

Central nervous system
 Neuron
 Glia
 Astrocyte
 Ependymocytes
 Muller glia (retina)
 Oligodendrocyte
 Oligodendrocyte progenitor cell
 Pituicyte (posterior pituitary)

Pineal gland
 Pinealocyte

Cells derived from mesoderm

Paraxial mesoderm

Mesenchymal stem cell

Osteochondroprogenitor cell
 Bone (Osteoblast → Osteocyte)
 Cartilage (Chondroblast → Chondrocyte)

Myofibroblast
 Fat
 Lipoblast → Adipocyte 
 Muscle
 Myoblast → Myocyte
 Myosatellite cell
 Tendon cell
 Cardiac muscle cell
Other
 Fibroblast → Fibrocyte

Other
 Digestive system
 Interstitial cell of Cajal

Intermediate mesoderm

Renal stem cell
 Angioblast → Endothelial cell
 Mesangial cell
 Intraglomerular
 Extraglomerular
 Juxtaglomerular cell
 Macula densa cell
 Stromal cell → Interstitial cell → Telocytes
 Simple epithelial cell → Podocyte
 Kidney proximal tubule brush border cell

Reproductive system
 Sertoli cell
 Leydig cell
 Granulosa cell
 Peg cell
 germ cells (which migrate here primordially)
 spermatozoon
 ovum

Lateral plate mesoderm/hemangioblast

Hematopoietic stem cell
 Lymphoid
 Lymphoblast
 see lymphocytes
 Myeloid
 CFU-GEMM
 see myeloid cells

Circulatory system
 Endothelial progenitor cell
 Endothelial colony forming cell
 Endothelial stem cell
 Angioblast/Mesoangioblast
 Pericyte
 Mural cell

Cells derived from endoderm

Foregut

Respiratory system
 Pneumocyte
 Type I cell
 Type II cell
 Club cell
 Goblet cell
 Pulmonary neuroendocrine cell

Digestive system

Stomach
 Enteroendocrine cell
 G cell
 Delta cell
 Enterochromaffin-like cell
 Gastric chief cell
 Parietal cell
 Foveolar cell

Intestine
 Enteroendocrine cell
 Gastric inhibitory polypeptide
 S cell
 Delta cell
 Cholecystokinin
 Enterochromaffin cell
 Goblet cell
 Paneth cell
 Tuft cell
 Enterocyte
 Microfold cell

Liver
 Hepatocyte
 Hepatic stellate cell

Gallbladder
 Cholecystocyte

Exocrine component of pancreas
 Centroacinar cell
 Pancreatic stellate cell

Islets of Langerhans
 alpha cell
 beta cell
 delta cell
 PP cell (F cell, gamma cell)
 epsilon cell

Pharyngeal pouch
 Thyroid gland
 Follicular cell
 Parafollicular cell
 Parathyroid gland
 Parathyroid chief cell
 Oxyphil cell

Hindgut/cloaca
 Urothelial cell

See also
Germ layer
List of distinct cell types in the adult human body

References 

Germ layers
Embryology
Gastrulation